Leonid Vilgelmovich Lesh (Russian, Леонид Вильгельмович Леш, January 9, 1862 – August 28, 1934) was an Imperial Russian army commander. He served in China and fought in the war against the Empire of Japan. 

Lesh took over command of the Third Army during the Gorlice–Tarnów offensive.

After the October Revolution of 1917, he fought against the Bolsheviks. With the defeat of the White Army in the civil war, he emigrated to Yugoslavia. He died in what is now Croatia.

Awards
Gold Sword for Bravery
Order of Saint George, 4th degree
Order of Saint George, 3rd degree
Order of the White Eagle (Russian Empire)
Order of Saint Anna, 1st class
Order of Saint Anna, 3rd class
Order of Saint Stanislaus (House of Romanov), 1st class
Order of Saint Stanislaus (House of Romanov), 3rd class

References

External links
 Страница на «Хроносе»
 Большая биографическая энциклопедия

1862 births
1934 deaths
Imperial Russian Army generals
Russian military personnel of the Boxer Rebellion
Russian military personnel of the Russo-Japanese War
Russian military personnel of World War I
People of the Russian Civil War
Recipients of the Gold Sword for Bravery
Recipients of the Order of St. George of the Third Degree
Recipients of the Order of the White Eagle (Russia)
Recipients of the Order of St. Anna, 1st class
Recipients of the Order of St. Anna, 3rd class
Recipients of the Order of Saint Stanislaus (Russian), 1st class
Recipients of the Order of Saint Stanislaus (Russian), 3rd class